Mephisto Odyssey is an American house music group from San Francisco, California, United States, who have been credited with helping to pioneer the San Francisco house music sound. The group went on to release a number of self-released singles until doing tenures at City of Angels and Warner Bros. Records from the mid-1990s into the early 2000s. Mephisto Odyssey are also credited with being the only group to officially remix Jane's Addiction for the maxi-single "So What!". The group released many singles and remixes as well as an EP and two albums during the life of the band. This included the song "Crash" which was co written with Wayne Static of Static-X and "Some Kinda Freak" which was featured in the horror film Hostel.

Biography

Inception and debut single (1993—1996)
Mephisto Odyssey was originally formed in the fall of 1993 by musician, songwriter / producer Mikael Johnston and producer / songwriter Michael Ames. Johnston's high school friend and fellow musician Orpheos Dejournette joined the group shortly after. The group's first single, the self-released "Dream of the Black Dahlia” (1993), earned kudos from Bay Area promoters and the international underground scene including DJ Garth of Greyhound Recordings who was the first international DJ to play the track. Ames left the group permanently after the release of their first single.

City of Angels (1996—1998)
Mephisto Odyssey now fronted by Johnston and Dejournette continued to release singles on their own label Mephisto Records until 1996 when they signed to the progressive West Coast label City of Angels. At City of Angels the group shared the talent roster with Überzone, Simply Jeff, Christopher Lawrence (DJ), Sandra Collins and future break beat kings, The Crystal Method. After a handful of singles and the release of their first album Catching The Skinny the then duo caught the ear of Warner Bros. Records A & R rep Troy Wallace. Wallace offered the duo the chance to work on a remix project with Jane's Addiction for the upcoming maxi single "So What!", Mephisto Odyssey co-produced the remixes with long-time friend and Primal Record Shop owner, Barrie Eves, who officially joined the group soon after. The official release featured 3 remixes by Mephisto Odyssey and went on to spend 6 weeks in the Billboard maxi singles chart which paved the way for a Warner Bros. Records recording contract (December 1998). DJ Josh Camacho also joined the group soon after the band signed to Warner Bros. as a touring member. To date Mephisto Odyssey are the only artists to officially remix Jane's Addiction.

The Warner Bros. Years (1998—2002)
While at Warner Bros. Records the group expanded further into the realm of engineering, producing and remixing by working with various artists sharing the roster. Mikael Johnston co-wrote, produced and engineered the single "Crash" with Wayne Static of Static-X which also appeared on the Static-X album Beneath... Between... Beyond... Mephisto Odyssey also appeared with Wayne Static and Koichi Fukuda in the song's video (directed by Len Wiseman), which aired in heavy rotation on MTVX. A Humble Brothers remix version of "Crash" was also featured on the soundtrack of Batman Beyond: Return of the Joker. Mephisto Odyssey did remixes for Los Amigos Invisibles "Mi Linda", Static-X's "Push It" and Soul Coughing's "Rolling" among others. An EP called The Lift which charted in the Billboard Hot Dance Club Play Chart, several singles and an album called The Deep Red Connection followed. A diverse array of guest vocalists appeared on the band's major label debut including Wayne Static, Hafdis Huld of Gus Gus, former 4ad artist Paula Frazer and Mad Lion. The group left Warner Bros. at the beginning of 2002 and disbanded.

Mephisto Odyssey reunite (2006—2008) 
In 2006 founding member Mikael Johnston and DJ Josh Camacho reunited under the Mephisto Odyssey moniker to release several singles under their new Groove Quest label. Some of the singles released were "Superphonic" on N-mitysound Records, "Sexy Love" and "Bump."
In 2008 Mikael Johnston put Mephisto Odyssey in moratorium to become one half of the music production team Dresden and Johnston with long-time friend Dave Dresden.

Discography
 Dream of the Black Dahlia (EP) 12" - Orpheos Productions 1994
 Dream of the Black Dahlia Remixes 12" - Mephisto Records through Hi-Bias 1994
 Dream of the Black Dahlia on Twitch Vol. 10 12" - Twitch Records 1994
 Catching the Skinny EP 12" - Mephisto Records through Hi-Bias 1994
 The Motive EP 12" - Mephisto Records 1995
 Transhumance feat. John Kozak - San Francisco Sound Spectrum (under the name Odyssey Arcane) 12" Twitch Records 1995
 The Tyburn Swing on RAW OXYGEN 5: Cool Neurotica 12" - Oxygen Music Works 1996
 Freak Lip Stomp, Dream of the Black Dahlia on Mephisto - The Subterranean Sounds of San Francisco 12" SSR/Crammed 1996
 Get Down (single) 12" - City of Angels Records - 1996
 Midntropolis (Single) 12" - City of Angels Records 1997
 Feterous Tripstride on The Sound of Young America 12" - City of Angels - 1997
 Catching the Skinny Album - City of Angels 1997
 Jane's Addiction - So What EP Mephisto Odyssey remixes 12" - Warner Bros. Records 1997
 Los Amigos Invisibles - Mi Linda Mephisto Odyssey Remixes 12" - Luaka Bop / WBR 1998
 Flow single (under the name Deep Red) 12" - Primal Trax / Warner Bros. Records 1999
 The Lift Remixes (EP) 12" Dbl Pack Primal Trax / Warner Bros. Records 2000
 The Deep Red Connection - Warner Bros. Records 2000
 Sexy Dancer (single) Hipp-E & Halo remix 12" - Primal Trax / Warner Bros. Records 2000
 Reach (single) feat Hafdis Huld 12" - Primal Trax / Warner Bros. Records 2000
 Killah (single) feat Jamalski 12" - Primal Trax / Warner Bros. Records 2001
 Some Kinda Freak (single) feat. Ultra Violet Catastrophe remix 12" - Primal Trax / Warner Bros. Records 2001
 Crash Video (Featuring Static-X, directed by Len Wiseman) - Warner Bros. Records 2001
 Rites of Passage (single) 12" - The Joint / Waako records 2004

References

External links
MEPHISTO ODYSSEY

Electronic music groups from California
Ableton Live users
Club DJs
American DJs
DJs from San Francisco
American electronic musicians
Record producers from California
American trance musicians
Remixers
Electronic dance music DJs